Sergei Nikolayevich Pravkin (born 20 January 1980) is a Russian footballer. He plays for FC Ryazan.

Club career
He made his Russian Premier League debut for FC Shinnik Yaroslavl on 29 March 2008 in a game against FC Luch-Energiya Vladivostok.

Honours
 Russian Second Division Zone South best goalkeeper: 2004.

External links
  Player page on the official FC Shinnik Yaroslavl website
 

1980 births
People from Danilovsky District, Yaroslavl Oblast
Living people
Russian footballers
Russian expatriate footballers
Expatriate footballers in Ukraine
Russian expatriate sportspeople in Ukraine
Russian Premier League players
Ukrainian Premier League players
FC Dynamo Stavropol players
FC Shinnik Yaroslavl players
FC Salyut Belgorod players
FC Baltika Kaliningrad players
Association football goalkeepers
FC Spartak Ryazan players
Sportspeople from Yaroslavl Oblast